Ida Township may refer to one of the following places in the United States:

 Ida Township, Michigan
 Ida Township, Douglas County, Minnesota

See also
 Lake Ida Township, Norman County, Minnesota

Township name disambiguation pages